Carolyn Marie West is associate professor of psychology (family violence and human sexuality course), at the University of Washington Tacoma, and was the first holder of the Bartley Dobb Professorship for the Study and Prevention of Violence (2005-2008).

West is one of the chief editors of the journal Sexualization, Media, and Society. She also sits on the editorial boards of Partner Abuse and Women & Therapy, and was previously on the editorial board of Sex Roles.

Education 

West gained her degree in 1986, her masters in 1988 and her doctorate in clinical psychology in 1994. She studied for all three at the University of Missouri–St. Louis. West carried out her predoctoral internship (1993-1994) at the University of Notre Dame Counseling Center and Oaklawn Hospital, Indiana

Career 
West completed a postdoctoral research scholarship at the University of New Hampshire's Family Research Laboratory. She has also served as an expert witness in domestic violence cases involving victim-defendants and testified at Congressional Briefings in Washington, DC.

Awards 
 2000 Outstanding Research Award from the University of Minnesota's Institute on Domestic Violence in the African American Community.
 2004 American Psychological Association's (Section 35, APA Society for the Psychology of Women) Carolyn Payton Early Career Award.
 2013 University of Washington Distinguished Teaching Award.

Bibliography

Books 
 
 
A monograph published simultaneously as:

Chapters in books 
1995–1999
  Preview.
  Preview. Pdf.
  Description of "Mammy", "Sapphire", and "Jezebel". Preview.
Also see:  Blog based on the journal article.

2000–2004
 
 
  Pdf.
  Pdf.
 
Also see:  Blog based on the journal article.
 

2005–2009
 
  Pdf.
 
  Pdf.
 
Also printed as:  Pdf.
  Pdf.
 
   Pdf.
  Pdf.

2010–2014
 
  Pdf.
  Pdf.
 

2015 onwards
  Preview.

Journal articles 
1990–1999
 
  Blog based on the journal article.
  Pdf.
Also printed as: 

2000–2009
  Pdf.
  Pdf.
 
 
 Issue of Women & Therapy which used a Black feminist framework to investigate childhood sexual abuse, intimate partner violence, sexual assault, sexual harassment and community violence in the lives of African American women.
 
  Pdf.
 
  Pdf.
  Pdf.
  Pdf.
Members of the Committee on Professional Practice and Standards (COPPS): Cynthia A. Sturm; Kristin A. Hancock; Armand R. Cerbone; Victor de La Cancela; Mary A. Connell; William E. Foote; Michele M. Galietta; Larry C. James; Leigh W. Jerome; Sara J. Knight; David C. Mohr; and Philip H. Witt. 
  Pdf.
 
  Pdf.
  Pdf.

2010 onwards
  Pdf.
 
 
 West, Carolyn M. (forthcoming). ""My soul looks back and wonders how I made it over": battered Black women's healing journey". Journal of Aggression, Maltreatment & Trauma (Taylor and Francis).
 West, Carolyn M. (forthcoming). "African immigrant women and intimate partner violence: "The Oceans and Elephants Between Us"". Journal of Aggression, Maltreatment & Trauma (Taylor and Francis).

Other 
  
West was keynote speaker at a conference organized by Kathy Ferguson coordinator of the Maryland Coalition Against Sexual Assault. The conference was held at Prince George's Community College in Largo, April 2006.

References

External links 
 Dr. Carolyn West
 Profile page: Carolyn West University of Washington Tacoma

African-American educators
African-American feminists
American feminists
American women academics
Anti-pornography activists
Anti-prostitution activists in the United States
Clinical psychologists
Living people
Place of birth missing (living people)
University of Missouri–St. Louis alumni
University of Washington faculty
Year of birth missing (living people)
21st-century African-American people
21st-century African-American women